Tosin Omoyele (born 3 August 1996, in Lagos State, Nigeria) is a Nigerian footballer who plays as a striker for USM Khenchela.

Career
He started his career at City of David (COD) academy in 2012 and made his first-team debut for COD's first team in 2015. Omoyele spent a season there scoring six goals from 10 matches.

He moved to Osun United F.C. the following season where he scored 17 goals and five assists in 30 games for the Oshogbo-based side. He moved to Plateau United FC in 2017, where he scored nine goals and 10 assists in 28 games before moving to Egypt with Nogoom FC, and then back to Plateau United the following season.

In 2022,he joined Enyimba Football Club of Aba.
In 2022,he signed a contract with USM Khenchela.

Honours
Winners Medal – Nationwide League with C.O.D United 2014/2015

Winners Medal – Osun State FA Cup 2017

Highest Goal Scorer - Nigeria National League 2017

Winners Medal – Plateau State FA  2018

National Team
2018 CHAN Team (Nigeria), part of the 30 man squad called up
WAFU Tournament, 2018
CHAN 2021 Qualifiers

References

1996 births
Living people
Nigerian footballers
Association football forwards
COD United F.C. players
Osun United F.C. players
Plateau United F.C. players
Nogoom FC players
Enyimba F.C. players
USM Khenchela players